The Port of Huanghua, also known as the Port of Cangzhou Huanghua is an artificial deep-water international seaport on the coast of Huanghua, Cangzhou Prefecture, Hebei, People's Republic of China. It is located on the south side of the Bohai Bay, 90 km from Cangzhou city. Huanghua port is one of the largest and fastest growing ports in North China, with a throughput of 171.03 million tons of total cargo in 2013, an increase of 35.42% year on year.

Throughput increased to 204 million tonnes in the first ten months of 2016, largely due to coal transportation. Investment in the port is over $8 billion, and over 20 shipping companies opened 13 shipping lines from the port.

Huanghua Port is owned by China Shenhua Energy, its port division provides all coal transportation services at Huanghua.

History

Layout
The Port of Huanghua is divided into four port areas: the Coal Port Area, the Comprehensive Cargo Port Area, the Estuary Port Area, and the Bulk Cargo Port Area, which is under construction.

The port currently operates a total of 10 berths including two general bulk berths, two general cargo berths and four multipurpose berths. Construction of two 200,000-tonne ore berths was completed in 2015. When fully developed the port will cover 141 square kilometres.

Administration
The Huanghua Port is operated by the Qinhuangdao Port Co., Ltd, a subsidiary of the Hebei Port Group Co., Ltd

Operations
In 2016, Huanghua Port became the largest coal transportation port in China. In 2016, it shipped over 170 million tonnes of coal, a year on year increase of 47%.

References

External links
 Port of Hebei website

Ports and harbours of China